The canton of Le Nord-Toulois is an administrative division of the Meurthe-et-Moselle department, northeastern France. It was created at the French canton reorganisation which came into effect in March 2015. Its seat is in Liverdun.

It consists of the following communes:

Aingeray
Andilly
Ansauville
Avrainville
Beaumont
Bernécourt
Bois-de-Haye
Boucq
Bouillonville
Bouvron
Bruley
Charey
Domèvre-en-Haye
Dommartin-la-Chaussée
Essey-et-Maizerais
Euvezin
Flirey
Fontenoy-sur-Moselle
Francheville
Gézoncourt
Gondreville
Griscourt
Grosrouvres
Hamonville
Jaillon
Jaulny
Lagney
Limey-Remenauville
Lironville
Liverdun
Lucey
Mamey
Mandres-aux-Quatre-Tours
Manoncourt-en-Woëvre
Manonville
Martincourt
Ménil-la-Tour
Minorville
Noviant-aux-Prés
Pannes
Rembercourt-sur-Mad
Rogéville
Rosières-en-Haye
Royaumeix
Saint-Baussant
Saizerais
Sanzey
Seicheprey
Thiaucourt-Regniéville
Tremblecourt
Trondes
Viéville-en-Haye
Vilcey-sur-Trey
Villers-en-Haye
Villey-Saint-Étienne
Xammes

References

Cantons of Meurthe-et-Moselle